is a Japanese voice actress from Nagano Prefecture affiliated with VIMS.

Biography
Hashimoto became interested in acting, while watching a concert held by the cast for the anime series Di Gi Charat. Although her parents were disapproved of her plans, partly as a joke, she enrolled at a voice acting school operated by the agency VIMS. She made her voice acting debut as Mitsuki Kanzaki, the lead character of the 2014 anime television series Recently, My Sister Is Unusual.

Filmography

Anime
2014
Recently, My Sister Is Unusual as Mitsuki Kanzaki
M3 the dark metal as Girl C
Monthly Girls' Nozaki-kun as Female student (episode 8)
Samurai Flamenco as Fan
Your Lie in April as Girl (episode 3)
Argevollen as Shion Kaoru
Shirobako as Endō's wife (episodes 5–6)
Bladedance of Elementalers as Reishia
Selector Spread WIXOSS as Female student (episode 2); Girl (episode 10)
Wolf Girl and Black Prince as Kanon Yamamoto

2015
Absolute Duo as Student
School-Live! as Female student (episode 2)
Shimoneta as Announcer
Maria the Virgin Witch as Susanne
Is It Wrong to Try to Pick Up Girls in a Dungeon? as Misha Flott
Death Parade as Friend B
To Love-Ru Darkness 2nd as Student B, Girl A
Hello!! Kiniro Mosaic as Female student B
Aria the Scarlet Ammo Double A as Yoyo
Sound! Euphonium as Brass band member (eps 7, 9–10)
Prison School as Chiyo Kurihara
YuruYuri San Hai! as Shihoko Azuma (art teacher; episode 3)

2016
Keijo as Rei Mikawa
Maho Girls PreCure! as Emily
The Morose Mononokean as Shizuku
Lostorage incited WIXOSS as Suzuko Homura

2018
The Ryuo's Work Is Never Done! as Ayano Sadatō
Lostorage conflated WIXOSS as Suzuko Homura

2019
Magical Girl Spec-Ops Asuka as Sayako Hata
High School Prodigies Have It Easy Even In Another World as Rue

2020
Princess Connect! Re:Dive as Eriko / Eriko Kuraishi

2021
Cute Executive Officer as Riya Motohashi

2022
Love After World Domination as Urami Magahara
Princess Connect! Re:Dive Season 2 as Eriko / Eriko Kuraishi
Extreme Hearts as QON-N4CX Nono

2023
Cute Executive Officer R as Riya Motohashi

Video games
2016
KanColle Kai as USS Iowa
Genkai Tokki: Seven Pirates as Poron
Gal Gun: Double Peace as Maya Kamizono

2017
Kantai Collection as USS Iowa and Yamakaze
School Girl/Zombie Hunter as Mayaya Himeji

2018
Azur Lane as HMS Prince of Wales
Princess Connect! Re:Dive as Eriko Kuraishi

2021
Uma Musume Pretty Derby as Fine Motion

2022
Grim Guardians: Demon Purge as Maya Kamizono

References

External links
Official agency profile 

Living people
Voice actresses from Nagano Prefecture
Japanese video game actresses
Japanese voice actresses
Year of birth missing (living people)